Headis is a mix of table tennis and the heading of association football. It is played at a regular table tennis table so it combines tactical elements of table tennis and the legwork of tennis. In mid-2016, the 11th Headis World Championship was held with players from 12 countries.

History 
Headis (head + the ending of tennis) was invented in 2006 by the at that time sport student René Wegner. A football pitch in Kaiserslautern, Germany was occupied but the table tennis table was available so they started playing a rubber ball only with their heads.

Initial spreading 
Headis started spreading throughout German students. The Universität des Saarlandes was the first institution with regular Headis training. More and more universities added the sport to their schedule. 

Besides universities there are also other possibilities to play Headis. The 1. FC Kaiserslautern and the SV Darmstadt 98 offer regular training.

Beginning of the tournament series 
In 2008, the first Headis World Cup Tournaments were hosted.

In 2010 and 2011 in Kaiserslautern, there was the adh-Trophy Headis (Allgemeiner Deutscher Hochschulsportverband), which is the German University Headis Championship.

In 2016, there were eleven World Cup Tournaments with more than 1,000 competitors.

Recent history 
Several TV appearances and viral videos online increased the popularity within the last years. Currently, 18 German universities offer regular Headis courses.

By 2016, there were international tournaments, World and European Championships and an estimated number of players of 100,000. Starting at Universität des Saarlandes the sport spread all over Germany.

The sport is popular in other countries than Germany as well. There are official partners in Switzerland, Belgium, the Netherlands, Czech Republic, the Dominican Republic, China, Australia and Japan.

Every year there are 10 to 12 tournaments that are the base for the Headis World Championship.

Rules and gameplay 
Two players play at a regular table tennis table and the ball must only make contact with the head. The table, however, can be touched by any part of your body. Playing a volley is allowed as well. After every ball played, you have to touch the ground before heading the next ball.

Sets are played to eleven (11) points, with the exception that players must win by two (2) points. Games are decided by best-of-three (3) sets.

Equipment 
 Table tennis table: Headis is played at a regular table tennis table. The measurements are the same. As the Headis ball is heavier than a table tennis ball, the net is made of metal so it is more stable.
 Headis ball: Headis is played with a special ball.

Tournament Series

Setup of the Tournament Series 
Every year there are 10 to 12 Headis World Cup Tournaments held. The results of these tournaments is the basis for the Headis World Ranking.

Player names 
The players do not use their regular names at the tournaments. They instead choose joke names like "Headi Potter" or "Rolli der Schlächter".

World ranking 
The Headis World Ranking is compiled by the results of the Headis World Cup Tournaments. The players receive World Ranking points according to their ranking at the tournaments. The bigger the tournament, the more points the players get. The last 15 tournaments build the ranking. As of May 2017, the two top players in the world are Cornelius "Headsinfarkt" Döll (1,624 points) and Margarita "Klausi" Marmol Fernandez (890 points).

Most important tournaments

World Championship 
The annual Headis World Championship is the most important tournament all year. It is the only tournament with unlimited players and it affects the World Ranking more than every other tournament. At the World Championship 2016 there were players from 12 nations.

European Championship 
Since 2015, a European Championship (EC) is hosted. The EC is the only tournament where men and women play the same competition. In 2015, four countries competed: Germany, Czech Republic, Switzerland and Belgium. In 2016, the Dominican Republic joined the tournament as well. The EC does not affect the World Ranking.

Headis Masters 
Since 2011, the annual Headis Masters is hosted. The 18 best men and the eight best women of the last calendar year qualify for it. The starting field is completed by two wildcards each.

References

External links 
 Official website
 Official rules (in English)

Ball games
Individual sports
Hybrid sports
Sports originating in Germany